This list of first ascents in the Sierra Nevada can be sorted by any listed characteristic. The route taken and its Yosemite Decimal System rating are given where known. The only criterion for inclusion is the historic notability of the climb when it was completed. Both first ascents of summits by any route, and first ascents of technical non-summit routes, are listed.

References

 
 

 

 
 

History of the Sierra Nevada (United States)
History of mountaineering
A
Mountaineering in the United States
Climbing and mountaineering-related lists